Joseph G. Peterson (born 1965) is an American novelist and poet from Chicago, Illinois. He grew up in Wheeling, Illinois and attended Wheeling High School. He worked at an aluminum mill and then studied philosophy at the University of Chicago. He lives in Chicago with his wife and two daughters.

From 1992-1998, he edited and published the zine Storyhead, which Factsheet Five called "a zine of stunning illustration and provocative writing that ranks among the very best." Peterson published writers such as Stu Mead, David Greenberger, and Wisława Szymborska, recipient of the 1996 Nobel Prize for Literature.

Critical reception

Reviews of Peterson's first novel Beautiful Piece, paid particular attention to the unusual structure of the narrative. In Prairie Schooner, J. Weintraub's review noted that the novel's structure "continues on a nonchronological progression all of its own, obsessively developing what has been, to a large degree, already revealed" in the first few pages. Weintraub compared the effect of this repetition to musical composition: "Like a musical composition by Philip Glass or Brian Eno, themes are introduced, repeated, ornamented, taken in a new direction, repeated, and varied again." Stuart Shiffman writing in the Illinois Times called it "an entertaining and gritty novel written in the noir style of mysteries".

Peterson second work was an epic poem, Inside the Whale, which Publishers Weekly noted as following 'Irishman Jim O'Connor, an aspiring poet and successful alcoholic, as he moves disastrously through life in modern Chicago. In addition to Peterson's narrative, plenty of Jim's 'actual' poems appear throughout, facilitating an effortless shifting between third and first person accounts of the drunken bard's exploits."

Wanted: Elevator Man was analyzed by Daniel Mattingly in "Crash Fiction: American Literary Novels of the Global Financial Crisis" (along with The Financial Lives of the Poets by Jess Walters and Union Atlantic by Adam Haslett) as an example of "crash fiction"—novels that reflect the economic recession that followed the crash of 2008. According to Mattingly, these novels examine "the perils of under-employment, financial strain in middle class families, and young adults struggling to find work after graduating from university. In all three of these novels the protagonists start out with expectations of joining the elites but find themselves struggling for employment and dealing with the diminished expectations that their current employment brings. In Wanted: Elevator Man, Peterson looks at a figure, Barnes who aspires to a corner office in a glitzy sky-rise building, but ends up as a helper to an elevator mechanic working in the bowels of a sky-rise."

The title character of Peterson's third novel, Gideon's Confession, is reminiscent of Herman Melville's Bartleby. Gideon describes himself as  "a compass without a magnet" and drifts through an existential indecision funded by regular checks from a wealthy uncle. Reviewing the book in South Side Weekly Olivia Stovicek called it "a powerful meditation on the allure of inaction and the paralyzing effects of choice" while also noting that "ending is abrupt."

Novels and Stories

 Beautiful Piece (Switchgrass Books, an imprint of Northern Illinois University Press), 2009, 
 Inside The Whale: A Novel in Verse (Wicker Park Press), 2011, 
 Wanted: Elevator Man (Switchgrass Books), 2012, 
 Gideon's Confession (Switchgrass Books), 2014, 
 Twilight of the Idiots: Stories (Chicago Center for Literature and Photography, 2015)
 Gunmetal Blue (Tortoise Books, 2017)
 Ninety-Nine Bottles (Tortoise Books, 2019)
 The Rumphulus (University of Iowa Press, 2020)
 Memorandum from the Iowa Cloud Appreciation Society (University of Iowa Press, 2022)

References

External links
 Author page at Poets & Writers

21st-century American poets
Living people
1965 births
American male poets
Writers from Chicago
Date of birth missing (living people)
People from Wheeling, Illinois
21st-century American male writers